Diego Luiz Dedoné, sometimes known as just Diego  (born September 12, 1985, in Bandeirantes, Paraná), is a Brazilian striker. He currently plays for Toledo-PR on loan from União Bandeirante.

Diego Dedoné made three appearances in Campeonato Brasileiro Série B with Guaratinguetá, including a 2–1 victory over Vila Nova where he suffered a violent kick to the head from teammate Everton while he attempted to block the ball from crossing the goal-line.

Contract
Toledo-PR (Loan) 3 March 2008 to 30 June 2008
União Bandeirante 1 December 2006 to 1 December 2009

References

External links
 CBF
 sambafoot

1985 births
Living people
Association football forwards
Brazilian footballers
Club Athletico Paranaense players
Guaratinguetá Futebol players
União Bandeirante Futebol Clube players